Wacca Airport  (also known as Tarche Soddo) is an airfield in Wacca, Ethiopia. It has an unpaved runway, with a length of about 1,200 meters. Records at the Nordic Africa Institute website show it was in existence in the 1970s.

References

Airports in Ethiopia
Southern Nations, Nationalities, and Peoples' Region